The 2009–10 season was Kilmarnock's eleventh consecutive season in the Scottish Premier League, having competed in it since its inauguration in 1998–99. Kilmarnock also competed in the Scottish Cup and the League Cup.

Summary

Season
Kilmarnock finished eleventh in the Scottish Premier League with 33 points, only being spared from relegation on the final day of the season with a 0–0 draw against Falkirk. Kilmarnock also reached the third round of the League Cup, losing to St. Mirren and the quarter–final of the Scottish Cup, losing to Celtic.

Results and fixtures

Kilmarnock's score comes first

Scottish Premier League

Scottish League Cup

Scottish Cup

Player statistics

|}

Final league table

Results by round

Transfers

Players in

Players out

Notes

References

External links
 Kilmarnock F.C. website
 BBC My Club page

Kilmarnock F.C. seasons
Kilmarnock